Bamboo Club, nicknamed Bamboo, is a Romanian-based chain of nightclubs with headquarters in Bucharest, Romania, owned and operated by Giosue "Joshua" Castellano. The first club was opened in the capital of Romania in 2002. Bamboo Group Entertainment also includes clubs in Brașov, Mamaia and Miami Beach. Red Club and Le Gaga clubs in Bucharest together with Bamboo Ballroom, Bamboo Fitness, Bamboo Luxury and Bamboo Pool are also part of the franchise.
On January 21, 2017, the Bucharest Bamboo Club was completely destroyed by a fire. There were no victims, but many attendants were injured.

Bamboo Miami
The Romanian-based Group took over the historic Paris Theatre and renovated it, preserving its classic Art Deco ornamentation. The venue features now a 2 ton Swarovski crystal chandelier and was supplied with Audio Formula L-Acoustics loudspeaker system.

Artists who Performed at Bamboo Club
Romania
Inna
Missy Elliott
Busta Rhymes
Pussycat Dolls
Ja Rule
Shaggy
Lil' Kim
Fat Joe
Kelly Rowland
Fatman Scoop
Flo Rida
Ciara 
Amerie
Jay Sean
Bob Sinclar
Xzibit
Pitbull (in Le Gaga)

Miami
Snoop Dogg
Ne-Yo
Flo Rida
Paul Oakenfold
Tyga
Alejandro Sanz
Timbaland

Celebrity Spotting at Bamboo Club
Romania
Mohammed Al Habtoor, son of billionaire Khalaf Al Habtoor
Jean-Claude Van Damme
Marcus Prinz von Anhalt
Adrian Mutu
David Trezeguet
Yaaron Mor, world famous whiskey drinker
Emerson
Errol Zimmerman
Kiowa Gordon (Le Gaga)

Miami
Chris Bosh
LeBron James
Dwyane Wade
Baltimore Ravens
Ray J
P. Diddy
Rick Ross

Franchises 
Romania
 Bucharest.
 Mamaia.
 Brașov.
 Cluj-Napoca

United States
 Miami Beach, Florida (located at Paris Theatre on 550 Washington Avenue, South Beach).

See also

List of electronic dance music venues

References 

2002 establishments in Romania
Restaurants established in 2002
Nightclubs in Romania
Nightclubs in Bucharest
Nightclubs in Constanța
Nightclubs in Brașov
Nightclubs in the United States
Nightclubs in Miami
Franchises
Electronic dance music venues